Brín-Navolok is a town in northern Russia, located in the Arkhangelsk region. It is the namesake of the Brin-Navolok municipality, as well as its administrative and geographical centre.

Geography 
Brin-Navolok is situated on the west bank of the Northern Dvina Bay, about 130 km South-East of Arkhangelsk and 1,125 km North-East of Moscow. The nearest settlement is 34 km from the village of Emetsk, and 28 km from the nearest railway station in Kholmogory.

The town covers a total area of 19 square kilometers.

Brin-Navolok is the origin point of the route R1, beginning at the intersection of Federal highway M8, passing through the Kenozero national Park, and ending in the village of Prokshino

The Russian reserve and the Antony of Siya monastery are located 19 km from Brin-Navolok.

Time zone 
Brin-Navolok, as well as all of the Arkhangelsk region, run on Moscow Time Zone(MSK/MSD).

Disputed value 
Brin-Navolok also is the Union of all 26 settlements. Given this fact, the road signs locality "Brin-Navolok" on a white background, the Federal highway M8 (after reconstruction 2014) and R1 is installed on the boundaries of the municipality.

Ecology 
According to official statistics, the frequency of certain diseases, such as thyroid cancer, is higher than many other Russian towns.

Cosmodrome Booster Impact 
In January 1983, the booster launched from the Plesetsk Cosmodrome fell on the ice of the Northern Dvina near Brin-Navolok. After an explosion which deformed ice within a 50 meter radius, the rocket sank to the floor of the bay. Heptyl rocket fuel was found in a large area around the impact site, including near Brin-Navolok.

Climate 
Brin-Navolok's climate is that of the far North.

The climate is temperate, maritime, with long, moderately cold winters and short, cool summers. It is formed under the influence of the Northern seas and transfers air masses with Atlantic in small quantities solar radiation. The average January temperature is -12.8°C; in July it is 16.3 °C. The annual rainfall is 607 mm. The average annual temperature is 1.3 °C.

The climate is characterized by frequent weather changes, high humidity and a large number of days with precipitation. Although the cold air from the Siberian winter brings the temperature to around -30 degrees, thawing can occur during the winter some years. During the summer, hot air masses from the steppes of Kazakhstan can bring the heat to 30-35 degrees, though frost can still form on summer nights.

The highest recorded temperature in Brin-Navolok was 34.4 °C, recorded on July 13, 1972. The lowest recorded temperature was -45.2 °C, recorded on January 8, 1885.

Education

Institutions of General secondary education 
 Brin-Navolok high school
 Brin-Navolok school

 Institutions of preschool education
 Kindergarten № 9 "Brusnichka"
 Kindergarten № 17 "Rodnichok"

Sister cities 
  Trono, Sweden (27 October 2004)

Telecommunications 
All major Russian telecoms provide cellular coverage to the Brin-Navolok area. Rostelecom provides home television and broadband Internet. All television and radio in Brin-Navolok is broadcast digitally. The town also receives the free digital television 64, as well as three major Russian radio and three local radio stations.

Media

Radio stations 

  87,9 FM the clouds 
  89.6 FM Spring FM
  90,0 FM Sport FM 
  98.2 FM Atlantis FM 
  99,8 FM audio path 
 101.0 FM audio path 
 101.1 FM Radio Chanson
 101,2 FM Radio Dacha
 101.3 FM Radio station Hit FM
 101,6 FM Radio "Arkhangelsk"
 102,0 FM Radio "Yu-FM"
 102.4 FM Radio Modern
 102,8 FM — Europa Plus
 103,4 FM — Traffic Radio

 103.8 FM — Russian radio
 104.1 FM — Radio station "Autoradio-Plesetsk"
 104,2 FM Radio "NSN" 
 104,7 FM Nashe radio
 105.1 FM Radio Dacha (Aired from Severodvinsk)
 105,4 FM Retro FM
 105.7 FM The Echo of Moscow Radio station "Echo of Moscow"
 106,0 FM Radio Mayak
 106,4 FM —Mega FM
 107,4 FM Radio Station "State 29" " Arkhangelsk

Television 
 Channel one (Russia)
 The TV Channel "Russia 1 "TV Channel "Russia-1"
 Channel "Russia-24"
 TV Channel "Euronews"
 TV Centre / ATV
 NTV
 5 channel
 REN TV
 STS
 Star
 Match TV / Match TV
 the Disney Channel
 South
 STV

Printed publication 
 Newspapers: "Pravda Severa", "Arkhangelsk", "Wave", "Mariner North", "Fisherman of the North", "Business class Arkhangelsk", "Province", "The White Sea Region Courier", "The Truth North-West", "Northern Komsomolets" (stopped in 2010), "Propaganda", "Arkhangelsk — city of military glory"
 Logs: "coastal capital", "old Arkhangelsk", Magazine, "LJ" (closed in 2009), "7 bridges", "the World through the eyes of a child", "Mood", "UD", "Health Formula", Plus, "In machine", "Los Angels"
 Pomor encyclopedia
 Newspaper "Kholmogory Life"

Sights 
 Monument to the fallen in the great Patriotic war of 1941-1945 on the Northern Dvina Embankment.
 The house of Andriy Chudinov (building "Rakulskaya OOSH") is recognized as a cultural monument

The cathedrals, Parishes and Church Brin-Navolok 
 Chapel Of St. Nicholas The Wonderworker
 Church of the resurrection
 The Church of purification
 Antony of Siya monastery
 The Church of the GreatMartyr

Literature 
 "Varacheva L. V. "the Village by the Dvina".- Arkhangelsk, 2012"

References

Cities and towns in Arkhangelsk Oblast
Geography of Arkhangelsk Oblast